Umut Bulut (born 15 March 1983) is a Turkish professional footballer who plays for Eyüpspor. Between 2007 and 2018, he made 39 appearances and scored ten goals for the Turkey national team.

Club career

Trabzonspor
Due to prolific goalscorer Fatih Tekke leaving the club, and the club having difficulties with results, Trabzonspor signed Bulut for €1.8 million on a four-year contract. He was given the number 10 jersey which was previously worn by Hami Mandıralı. His first match was on 5 August 2006 against Kayserispor. The following week he scored his first goal for the club in a 1–1 draw against Manisaspor. Overall, Bulut scored 88 goals in 197 official games for Trabzonspor, winning the 2010 Turkish Super Cup as well as the 2009–10 Turkish Cup, scoring in the final against rivals Fenerbahçe during a 3–1 win.

Toulouse
On 28 June 2011, Bulut signed with French club Toulouse FC for €4.8 million. He made his Ligue 1 debut against Ajaccio on 6 August 2011. One week later, he scored his first goal for the club against Dijon, before getting a second goal for Toulouse against Nancy in a 1–0 win. In the seventeenth week of the season, Bulut scored the winning goal in a 2–1 victory against Evian. The only other two goals he scored for the club were both against Lyon, including one from an outstanding long range shot.

Galatasaray

On 26 June 2012, Bulut joined Galatasaray on loan until the end of the season. He scored two goals on his debut for the club against their rivals Fenerbahçe during the 2012 Turkish Super Cup. Galatasaray won the game 3–2, with Bulut being named Man of the Match.

On 20 August 2012, Bulut made his first appearance in the 2012–13 Süper Lig season against Kasımpaşa as he was included in the starting eleven, and he scored a brace for Galatasaray as the game finished 2–1. Bulut got the equaliser in the following match against Beşiktaş as the game finished 3–3. On 2 September 2012, he again scored the opening goal of the match, in Galatasaray's 3–2 win against Bursaspor, the one thousandth league win in the club's history. Bulut's next goal came on 15 September 2012, scoring in the 90th minute as Galatasary won 4–0 against Antalyaspor. His five league goals in the first four weeks of the season surpassed the record set by Saša Ilić. On 19 October, Bulut scored an crucial goal for Galatasaray against Gençlerbirliği, helping his side come from 1–3 down to tie the game 3–3. After disappointing performances in both the Süper Lig and Champions League during the month of October, Bulut returned with another excellent match as he scored the opener against Kayserispor in a 3–0 win. The following week he scored his tenth goal of the season, again getting the opener in a 3–1 victory against İstanbul B.B. after converting from teammate Burak Yılmaz's assist.

Following his successful loan spell, Galatasaray officially signed Bulut from Toulouse on a 3+1 year deal for €2.7 million.

Eyüpspor
On June 18, 2021, Bulut signed a 1+1 year contract with Eyüpspor.

International career
Bulut made his international debut in Turkey's draw against Brazil on 5 June 2007. He scored his first two international goals on 2 June 2012, in a 3–1 friendly victory against Portugal. Bulut then scored a hat-trick against Andorra in Turkey's 5–0 World Cup qualifier win on 6 September 2013.

Personal life
On 14 March 2016, it was revealed that Umut Bulut's father Kemal had been killed in the Ankara Car bombing during the previous day, shortly after he had watched Galatasary's match against Gençlerbirliği.

Career statistics

Club

International

Source:

International goals
Scores and results table list Turkey's goal tally first.

Honours
Trabzonspor
Turkish Cup: 2009–10
Turkish Super Cup: 2010

Galatasaray
Süper Lig: 2012–13, 2014–15
Turkish Cup: 2013–14, 2014–15, 2015–16
Turkish Super Cup: 2012, 2013, 2015

Individual
Turkish Cup top scorer: 2009–10 (7 goals)

References

External links

1983 births
Living people
People from Yeşilhisar
Turkish footballers
Turkey international footballers
Turkey B international footballers
Turkey under-21 international footballers
Turkey youth international footballers
Turkish expatriate footballers
Turkish expatriate sportspeople in France
Expatriate footballers in France
Süper Lig players
Ligue 1 players
MKE Ankaragücü footballers
İnegölspor footballers
Trabzonspor footballers
Toulouse FC players
Galatasaray S.K. footballers
Kayserispor footballers
Association football forwards